Customs Diary is a 1993 Malayalam crime film by T. S. Suresh Babu starring Mukesh, Jagathy Sreekumar, Jayaram and Ganesh Kumar in the lead roles.

Cast
Mukesh as Rony Vincent/Rajappan/Rojappan
Jagathy Sreekumar as Aravindakshan, Customs officer
Jayaram as Anantha Krishnan, Customs officer 
Ganesh Kumar as Jamal
Ranjitha as Thara
Kuthiravattam Pappu as Padaval Vishwanathan
Sainuddin as Vikraman
 Radha Ravi as Kaliyappa
Keerikkadan Jose as Danny (dubbed by Jayaram)
 Santhosh as Babu
Kollam Thulasi as Rasheed, Customs officer
Babu Namboothiri as Padmanabha Iyer
Mala Aravindan as Skariachan
Prathapachandran as Customs Officer
 Santhakumari
Poojappura Ravi
Kanakalatha as  Mercykutty
Raveendran
 Shahana
 Kaladi Omana
 Kavitha Thampi as Reena, Rony's Sister
 Sabnam
 Seethal

References

External links
 

1993 films
1993 action comedy films
1990s Malayalam-language films
Indian action comedy films
Films directed by T. S. Suresh Babu